PHP-GTK is a set of language bindings for PHP which allow GTK GUI applications to be written in PHP. PHP-GTK provides an object-oriented interface to GTK classes and functions. While PHP-GTK partially supports GTK2, GTK3 is not supported at all.

History
PHP-GTK was originally conceived by Andrei Zmievski, who is also actively involved in the development of PHP and the Zend Engine. The idea was received well by the PHP community, and more people started to get involved with the project. James Moore and Steph Fox were among the first to join in, contributing a great deal to PHP-GTK through their documentation efforts, and Frank Kromann - also from the PHP development team - supplied Windows binaries for the project.

The first version of PHP-GTK was released in March 2001. More people began to get involved, and several extensions were contributed introducing new widgets, such as Scintilla and GtkHTML. PHP-GTK 1.0 was released in October 2003 alongside several extensions — including a wrapper for libglade, which allowed the cross-platform Glade UI builder to be used in creating PHP-GTK applications.

Present 
Zmievski and Fox are still working on the project, with Fox now maintaining PHP-GTK for Windows.

The planned next major release, PHP-GTK 2 fully utilizes PHP 5's powerful object model support, and brings the improved portability of GTK 2.6 as well as its new set of widgets.  The project also has support for GtkSourceView, which provides a source code editor widget. Around half the classes have been fully documented. Scott Mattocks, an active member of the PHP-GTK documentation group, has also written a book on the subject of PHP-GTK programming.

The project is only compatible with GTK 2, not version 3.

WxPHP (WxWidgets for PHP) exists as an alternative to develop GTK PHP applications.

Example 

<?php

function pressed()
{
    echo "Hello again - The button was pressed!\n";
}

$window = new GtkWindow();
$button = new GtkButton('Click');
$button1 = new GtkButton('Click');

$window->set_title('Hello World!');
$window->connect_simple('destroy', array('Gtk', 'main_quit'));
$button->connect_simple('clicked', 'pressed');
$button1->connect_simple('clicked', 'pressed');
$window->add($button);
$window->show_all();

Gtk::main();

The sample PHP-GTK 2 program instantiates a GtkWindow widget with the title "Hello World!", containing a GtkButton labelled "Click Me." When the button is pressed, the message "Hello again - The button was pressed!" is displayed on the console via the callback pressed.

Deployment 

Several tools have sprung up that assist the simple deployment of PHP-GTK applications. PHP compilers such as PriadoBlender and Roadsend PHP (Currently only compatible with PHP-GTK 1, while latest snapshot includes PHP-GTK 2) enable the compilation of applications written in PHP-GTK to a standalone binary executable. Alan Knowles' PECL package, bcompiler, also allows compilation of PHP into bytecode to hide the source code.

See also 

 wxPHP, PHP bindings to wxWidgets
 PHP-Qt, PHP bindings to the Qt toolkit
 WinBinder, Microsoft Windows API bindings for PHP.
 PHP Desktop, PHP desktop GUI framework with HTML5 Chrome/IE engine
 php-gui, an "extensionless" PHP GUI library

References

External links
Official website
Community site
Brazilian community site 
Github repository
RPGETv6 Beta Tool to encrypt PHPGTK Sourcecode

PHP software
GTK language bindings
Widget toolkits
Discontinued software